Sparta is an unincorporated community in Caroline County, in the U.S. state of Virginia. The Sparta area code is 804.

References

Unincorporated communities in Virginia
Unincorporated communities in Caroline County, Virginia